The 1921 season was the 2nd season of competitive football in Poland.

National teams

Poland national team

Notes and references